Fritz Reiche (July 4, 1883 – January 14, 1969) was a German physicist, a student of Max Planck and a colleague of Albert Einstein, who was active in, and made important contributions to the early development of quantum mechanics including co-authoring the Thomas-Reiche-Kuhn sum rule.

Fritz Reiche was born in 1883 in Berlin, Germany. In 1901 and 1902, he attended the University of Munich and he attended the University of Berlin from 1902 to 1907, where he received his PhD. From 1913 to 1920 as privatdozent he worked and taught under Planck in Berlin. Reiche published more than 55 scientific papers and books including The Quantum Theory.

He became a professor in 1921 at the University of Breslau and then was dismissed as a Jew from his academic position in 1933. Eventually, with the help of Ladenburg, Einstein, and the Emergency Committee in Aid of Displaced Foreign Scholars, Reiche emigrated with his family to the United States in 1941 and went on to work with NASA and the United States Navy on projects related to supersonic flow.

References

External links
search on author Fritz Reiche from Google Scholar

1883 births
1969 deaths
20th-century German physicists
20th-century American physicists
Academic staff of the University of Breslau
Jewish emigrants from Nazi Germany to the United States